Kewaigue is an area, hill and school near White Hoe in the parish of Braddan, near to Douglas, Isle of Man

References
 Gov.im Education Kewaigue school

Photographs
 White Hoe, Kewaigue, Braddan - The famous Okells Brewery 
 White Hoe (at Ellenbrook), Kewaigue- The new bridge and old "Snotty Bridge".

Geography of the Isle of Man